Taghafari or Tagafari is the base camp of Rakaposhi peak from Nagar side. Rakaposhi is a mountain in the Karakoram range of Gilgit–Baltistan, Pakistan.

See also
List of mountains in Pakistan
List of highest mountains

Rakaposhi